This is an incomplete list of paintings by the Russian artist Wassily Kandinsky (1866–1944). During his life, Kandinsky was associated with the art movements of Der Blaue Reiter, Expressionism and Abstract painting. Kandinsky is generally credited as the pioneer of abstract art.

After settling in Munich in 1896, Kandinsky formed Der Blaue Reiter with Paul Klee, Franz Marc and Gabriele Münter among others. He returned to Moscow in 1914, after the outbreak of World War I, though left after the Russian Revolution as "his spiritual outlook... was foreign to the argumentative materialism of Soviet society". He returned to Germany and taught at the Bauhaus school of art and architecture from 1922 until the Nazis closed it in 1933. He then moved to France, where he lived for the rest of his life, becoming a French citizen in 1939 and producing some of his most prominent art.

Paintings
{| class="wikitable sortable" text-align: center;"
|-
! Image
! YearTitle
! Location
! Made fromMaterialH x W in cmWikimedia
|-
|
|1898Odessa, Port
|Tretyakov Gallery, Moscow
|Oil paint on canvas65 x 45More images
|-
|
|1900Kochel – Waterfall I
|Lenbachhaus, Munich
|32.5 x 23.5More images
|-
|
|1901Schwabing, Winter Sun
|Musée National d'Art Moderne, Paris
|Oil paint on canvas board23.8 x 32.3More images
|-
|
|1901Munich – The Isar
|Lenbachhaus, Munich
|32.5 x 23.6More images
|-
|
|1901Clear Air
|Musée National d'Art Moderne, Paris
|Oil and tempera on canvas34 x 52.3More images
|-
|
|1901Sketch for Akhtyrka – Fall
|Lenbachhaus, Munich
|Oil paint on canvas23.6 x 32.7More images
|-
|
|1901Munich English Garden
|Lenbachhaus, Munich
|23.7 x 32.3More images
|-
|
|1901 to 1902Schwabing – Nikolaiplatz
|Lenbachhaus, Munich
|23.8 x 32.2More images
|-
|
|1901 to 1902Munich
|Solomon R. Guggenheim Museum, New York
|23.8 x 32.1Oil paint on card boardMore images
|-
|
|1901 to 1903Poplars
|Musée National d'Art Moderne, Paris
|23.5 x 32.8Oil paint on canvas boardMore images
|-
|
|1901 to 1903Kochel, Mountain Meadow
|Musée National d'Art Moderne, Paris
|24 x 32.8Oil paint  on canvas boardMore images
|-
|
|1901 to 1903Kochel, Landscape with Two Houses
|Musée National d'Art Moderne, Paris
|16.1 x 32.6Oil paint on canvas boardMore images
|-
|
|1901 to 1903Akhtyrka, Park
|Musée National d'Art Moderne, Paris
|23.7 x 32.8Oil paint on canvas boardMore images
|-
|
|1901 to 1905Binz auf Rügen (Twilight)
|Musée National d'Art Moderne, Paris
|23.2 x 32.8Oil paint on canvas boardMore images
|-
|
|1902Kochel, the Bridge
|Stedelijk Museum Amsterdam
|More images
|-
|
|1902Spring, Vicinity of Augsburg
|Musée National d'Art Moderne, Paris
|23.8 x 33Oil paint on card boardMore images
|-
|
|1902Kochel – Schlehdorf
|Lenbachhaus, Munich
|32.1 x 23.8More images
|-
|
|1902Kochel, Lake and Pier I
|Musée National d'Art Moderne, Paris
|24 x 33Oil paint on canvas boardMore images
|-
|
|1902Mountainous Landscape with Lake
|Lenbachhaus, Munich
|28 x 76More images
|-
|
|1902Kochel, Lake and Herzogstand
|Musée National d'Art Moderne, Paris
|23 x 32Oil paint on canvas boardMore images
|-
|
|1902Kochel, Old Kesselbergstrasse
|Musée National d'Art Moderne, Paris
|32.8 x 24Oil paint on canvas boardMore images
|-
|
|1902Winter in Schwabing
|Musée National d'Art Moderne, Paris
|23.7 x 32.9Oil paint on canvas boardMore images
|-
|
|1902Old Town II
|Musée National d'Art Moderne, Paris
|52 x 78.5oil paint on canvasMore images
|-
|
|1902 to 1903Munich, North Cemetery
|Musée National d'Art Moderne, Paris
|32 x 23.5Oil paint on canvas boardMore images
|-
|
|1902 to 1903Munich, English Garden (Lake with Dinghy)
|Musée National d'Art Moderne, Paris
|17 x 52.5Oil on card boardMore images
|-
|
|1903Kallmünz – Gabriele Münter painting I
|Lenbachhaus, Munich
|24 x 33More images
|-
|
|1903Kallmünz – Nature study on the Yellow Stagecoach
|Lenbachhaus, Munich
|23.4 x 32.8More images
|-
|
|1903The Blue Rider
|Private collection
|55 x 65Oil paint on card boardMore images
|-
|
|1903Kallmünz – Gabriele Münter painting II
|Lenbachhaus, Munich
|58.5 x 58.5Oil paint on canvasMore images
|-
|
|1904Nymphenburg
|Minneapolis Institute of Art
|Oil paint on canvasMore images
|-
|
|1904Amsterdam—View from the Window
|Solomon R. Guggenheim Museum, New York
|23.8 x 33Oil paint on card boardMore images
|-
|
|1904In the Forest
|Lenbachhaus, Munich
|26 x 19.8More images
|-
|
|1904Sketch for 'Sunday (Old Russian)'''
|Lenbachhaus, Munich
|38.5 x 89.2More images
|-
|
|1904Sunday (Old Russian)|Museum Boijmans Van Beuningen, Rotterdam
|45 x 95More images
|-
|
|1904Holland – beach chairs|Lenbachhaus, Munich
|24 x 32.8More images
|-
|
|1905Tunis, Street|Musée National d'Art Moderne, Paris
|24 x 32.8Oil paint on canvas boardMore images
|-
|
|1905Tunis, Coastal Landscape I|Musée National d'Art Moderne, Paris
|24 x 33Oil paint on canvas boardMore images
|-
|
|1905Tunis, Coastal Landscape II|Musée National d'Art Moderne, Paris
|24 x 33Oil paint on canvas boardMore images
|-
|
|1905Tunis, the Bay|Musée National d'Art Moderne, Paris
|24 x 33Oil paint on canvas boardMore images
|-
|
|1905Fishing Boats, Sestri|Solomon R. Guggenheim Museum, New York
|23.8 x 32.7Oil paint on card boardMore images
|-
|
|1905Arab City|Musée National d'Art Moderne, Paris
|67.3 x 99.5Tempera on card boardMore images
|-
|
|1905Landscape with Yellow Field|Lenbachhaus, Munich
|29.8 x 44.5More images
|-
|
|1905Russian beauty in a landscape|Lenbachhaus, Munich
|41.5 x 28.8Tempera on boardMore images
|-
|
|1906Saint-Cloud Park, Shaded Path|Musée National d'Art Moderne, Paris
|48 x 65Oil paint on canvasMore images
|-
|
|1906Rapallo, Stormy Sea|Musée National d'Art Moderne, Paris
|23 x 33Oil paint on canvas boardMore images
|-
|
|1906Rapallo – Bay|Lenbachhaus, Munich
|24 x 33.1More images
|-
|
|1906In the park of St. Cloud – Fall II|Lenbachhaus, Munich
|23.6 x 37.7More images
|-
|
|1906Pond in the Park|Solomon R. Guggenheim Museum, New York
|33 x 41Oil paint on card boardMore images
|-
|
|1906 to 1907Saint-Cloud Park|Musée National d'Art Moderne, Paris
|24 x 33Oil paint on card boardMore images
|-
|
|1906 to 1907Riding Couple|Lenbachhaus, Munich
|55 x 50.5Oil paint on canvasMore images
|-
|
|1907The Colourful Life|Lenbachhaus, Munich
|130 x 162.5Oil paint on canvasMore images
|-
|
|1908Murnau, Burggrabenstrasse 1|Dallas Museum of Art
|50.5 x 63.5Oil paint on card boardMore images
|-
|
|1908Red Church|Russian Museum, Saint Petersburg
|28 x 19.2
|-
|
|1908Munich-Schwabing with the Church of St. Ursula|Lenbachhaus, Munich
|68.8 x 49Oil paint on card board
|-
|
|1908View of Murnau|Hermitage Museum, Saint Petersburg
|33 x 44.5Oil paint on card board
|-
|
|1908Moscow Environs|Tretyakov Gallery, Moscow
|
|-
|
|1908Blue Mountain|Solomon R. Guggenheim Museum, New York
|107.3 x 97.6
|-
|
|1908The Ludwigskirche in Munich|Thyssen-Bornemisza Museum, Madrid
|67.3 x 96Oil paint on card board
|-
|
|1908Murnau – View over the Staffelsee|Lenbachhaus, Munich
|32.8 x 41Oil on pasteboard
|-
|
|1908Murnau – Landscape with a Tower|Musée National d'Art Moderne, Paris
|74 x 98.5Oil paint on card board
|-
|
|1908Murnau – View from the window of the Griesbräu|Lenbachhaus, Munich
|49.8 x 69.6Oil on pasteboard
|-
|
|1908Autumn in Bavaria|Musée National d'Art Moderne, Paris
|33 x 44.7Oil on paper on cardboard
|-
|
|1908Autumn Landscape with Boats|Private collection
|71 x 96.5Oil on board
|-
|
|1908Riegesee, the Village Church|Lenbachhaus, Munich
|33 x 45
|-
|
|1908Autumn in Murnau|Private collection
|32.3 x 40.9Oil on panel
|-
|
|1908Houses in Munich|Von der Heydt Museum, Wuppertal
|33 x 41Oil paint on card board
|-
|
|1908Murnau – Houses in the Obermarkt|Thyssen-Bornemisza Museum, Madrid
|64.5 x 50.2Oil paint on card board
|-
|
|1908Murnau, Dorfstrasse|Private collection
|48 x 69.5Oil paint on card board
|-
|
|1908Murnau – Top of the Johannisstrasse|Thyssen-Bornemisza Museum, Madrid
|70 x 48.5Oil paint on card board
|-
|
|1909Group in Crinolines|Solomon R. Guggenheim Museum, New York
|95.6 x 150.3
|-
|
|1909Study for Improvisation No. 2 (Funeral March)|Lenbachhaus, Munich
|49.8 x 69.8Oil on pasteboard
|-
|
|1909Study for Improvisation No. 3|Private collection
|44.5 x 64.7Oil and gouache on board
|-
|
|1909Improvisation No. 3|Musée National d'Art Moderne, Paris
|94 x 130
|-
|
|1909Improvisation 6 (African)|Lenbachhaus, Munich
|107 x 95.5
|-
|
|1909Railway near Murnau|Lenbachhaus, Munich
|36 x 49Oil on pasteboard
|-
|
|1909The Waterfall|Yale University Art Gallery, New Haven
|70 x 97.8Oil on pasteboard
|-
|
|1909Murnau – Castle and Church|Lenbachhaus, Munich
|33.1 x 44.8Oil on pasteboard
|-
|
|1909Arabs (Cemetery)|Kunsthalle Hamburg
|71.5 x 98Oil paint on card board
|-
|
|1909Cemetery and rectory in Kochel|Lenbachhaus, Munich
|44.4 x 32.7Oil paint on card board
|-
|
|1909Picture with an Archer|Museum of Modern Art, New York
|175 x 144.6
|-
|
|1909Kochel – Straight Street|Lenbachhaus, Munich
|32.9 x 44.6Oil on pasteboard
|-
|
|1909Landscape near Murnau with Locomotive|Solomon R. Guggenheim Museum, New York
|50.5 x 65.1Oil on board
|-
|
|1909Interior (My Dining Room)0
|Lenbachhaus, Munich
|50 x 65Oil on pasteboard
|-
|
|1909Bedroom in Aintmillerstrasse|Lenbachhaus, Munich
|48.5 x 69.5
|-
|
|1909Winter Landscape|Hermitage Museum, Saint Petersburg
|70 x 97Oil paint on card board
|-
|
|1909Painting with Houses|Stedelijk Museum Amsterdam
|
|-
|
|1909Mount|Lenbachhaus, Munich
|109 x 109
|-
|
|1909Houses at Murnau|Art Institute of Chicago
|49 x 64Oil paint on card board
|-
|
|1909Oriental|Lenbachhaus, Munich
|69.5 x 96.5Oil on pasteboard
|-
|
|1909Green Lane in Murnau|Lenbachhaus, Munich
|33 x 44.6Oil paint on card board
|-
|
|1909Murnau with Rainbow|Lenbachhaus, Munich
|33 x 43Oil paint on card board
|-
|
|1909 to 1910Sketch for "Composition II"|Solomon R. Guggenheim Museum, New York
|97.5 x 131.1
|-
|
|1910Study for Improvisation V|Minneapolis Institute of Art
|70.2 x 69.9Oil on pulp board
|-
|
|1910Lake|Tretyakov Gallery, Moscow
|98 x 105
|-
|
|1910Landscape with Rolling Hills|Solomon R. Guggenheim Museum, New York
|33 x 44.8Oil on board
|-
|
|1910Murnau – Mountain Landscape with the Church|Lenbachhaus, Munich
|32.7 x 44.8Oil paint on card board
|-
|
|1910View of Murnau with Church|Van Abbemuseum, Eindhoven
|110.6 x 120
|-
|
|1910Murnau with Church I|Lenbachhaus, Munich
|64.7 x 50.2Oil on pasteboard
|-
|
|1910Improvisation 7 (Storm)|Yale University Art Gallery, New Haven
|70 x 48.7Oil on pasteboard
|-
|
|1910Improvisation 9|Staatsgalerie Stuttgart
|110 x 110
|-
|
|1910Improvisation 11|Russian Museum, Saint Petersburg
|97.5 x 106.5
|-
|
|1910Improvisation 12 (The Rider)|Lenbachhaus, Munich
|97 x 106.5
|-
|
|1910The Cow|Lenbachhaus, Munich
|95.5 x 105
|-
|
|1910Improvisation 14|Musée National d'Art Moderne, Paris
|74 x 125
|-
|
|1910 to 1911Winter Landscape with Church|Solomon R. Guggenheim Museum, New York
|33 x 44.5Oil on board
|-
|
|1910 to 1911The Cossacks|Tate Modern, London
|94.6 x 130.2
|-
|
|1910 to 1911Study for "Winter No.2"|Lenbachhaus, Munich
|33.1 x 45Oil on pasteboard
|-
|
|1911Improvisation 18 (with Tombstone)|Lenbachhaus, Munich
|141 x 120
|-
|
|1911Improvisation 19|Lenbachhaus, Munich
|120 x 141.5
|-
|
|1911Improvisation 19a|Lenbachhaus, Munich
|97 x 106
|-
|
|1911Improvisation 21|Private collection
|108 x 108
|-
|
|1911Improvisation 21a|Lenbachhaus, Munich
|96 x 105
|-
|
|1911Impression III|Lenbachhaus, Munich
|77.5 x 100
|-
|
|1911Impression IV (Gendarme)|Lenbachhaus, Munich
|95 x 107
|-
|
|1911Impression V|Musée National d'Art Moderne, Paris
|106 x 157.5
|-
|
|1911Impression VI|Lenbachhaus, Munich
|107.5 x 95
|-
|
|1911The Lyrical|Museum Boijmans Van Beuningen, Rotterdam
|94 x 130
|-
|
|1911Pastorale|Solomon R. Guggenheim Museum, New York
|106.4 x 157.2
|-
|
|1911St George II|Russian Museum, Saint Petersburg
|107 x 95
|-
|
|1911St George III|Lenbachhaus, Munich
|97.5 x 107.5
|-
|
|1911All Saint's Day I|Lenbachhaus, Munich
|50 x 64.8Oil and gouache on cardboard
|-
|
|1911All Saint's Day II|Lenbachhaus, Munich
|86 x 99
|-
|
|1911Painting with Troika|Art Institute of Chicago
|69.7 x 97.3Oil paint on card board
|-
|
|1911Murnau with Locomotive|Saint Louis Art Museum
|95.9 x 104.5
|-
|
|1911Romantic Landscape|Lenbachhaus, Munich
|94.3 x 129
|-
|
|1911Eastern Suite (Arabs III)|National Gallery of Armenia, Yerevan
|106 x 157
|-
|
|1911Composition V|Private collection
|190 x 275
|-
|
|1911With Sun|Lenbachhaus, Munich
|30.6 x 40.3Reverse glass painting
|-
|
|1911All Saints Day I|Lenbachhaus, Munich
|34.5 x 40.5Reverse glass painting
|-
|
|1911Lion Hunt|Solomon R. Guggenheim Museum, New York
|9.4 x 13.6Oil reverse glass painting
|-
|
|1911Holy Vladimir|Lenbachhaus, Munich
|28.7 x 25.2Reverse glass painting
|-
|
|1911St. George III|Lenbachhaus, Munich
|23.6 x 22.8Tempera reverse glass painting
|-
|
|1911Apocalypti Horseman I|Lenbachhaus, Munich
|29.5 x 20.3Tempera and ink reverse glass painting
|-
|
|1911Santa Francisca|Solomon R. Guggenheim Museum, New York
|15.6 x 11.8Oil reverse glass painting
|-
|
|1911St. George II|Lenbachhaus, Munich
|Tempera reverse glass painting
|-
|
|1911Great Resurrection|Lenbachhaus, Munich
|23.8 x 24Tempera reverse glass painting
|-
|
|1912Judgement Day|Musée National d'Art Moderne, Paris
|33.6 x 45.3Water-based paint and India ink reverse glass painting
|-
|
|1912Improvisation 26|Lenbachhaus, Munich
|97 x 107.5
|-
|
|1912Improvisation 27 (Garden of Love II)|Metropolitan Museum of Art, New York
|120.3 x 140.3
|-
|
|1912Picture with Pince-nez|Musée National d'Art Moderne, Paris
|32.5 x 22.5Water-based paint and India ink reverse glass painting
|-
|
|1912Sketch 160A|Museum of Fine Arts, Houston
|94.9 x 108
|-
|
|1912Black Spot I|Russian Museum, Saint Petersburg
|101 x 131
|-
|
|1912Lady in Moscow|Lenbachhaus, Munich
|108.8 x 108.8
|-
|
|1912Improvisation 28|Solomon R. Guggenheim Museum, New York
|111.4 x 162.2
|-
|
|1912Improvisation 29 (The Swan)|Philadelphia Museum of Art
|106 x 97
|-
|
|1912Autumn II|The Phillips Collection, Washington D.C.
|60.6 x 82.5
|-
|
|1912Landscape with Two Poplars|Art Institute of Chicago
|78.8 x 100.4
|-
|
|1912With Rider|Musée National d'Art Moderne, Paris
|27.5 x 28Reverse glass painting
|-
|
|1913Landscape with Rain|Solomon R. Guggenheim Museum, New York
|70.5 x 78.4
|-
|
|1913Improvisation No. 30 (Cannons)|Art Institute of Chicago
|111 x 111.3
|-
|
|1913Improvisation 31 (Sea Battle)|National Gallery of Art, Washington D.C.
|140.7 x 119.7
|-
|
|1913Image with a White Shape|Kunstmuseum Den Haag
|120.3 x 139.8
|-
|
|1913Improvisation 33 (Orient I)|Stedelijk Museum Amsterdam
|
|-
|
|1913Black Lines|Solomon R. Guggenheim Museum, New York
|130.5 x 131.1
|-
|
|1913Composition VI|Hermitage Museum, Saint Petersburg
|195 x 300
|-
|
|1913Small Pleasures|Solomon R. Guggenheim Museum, New York
|110.5 x 120
|-
|
|1913Painting with White Border|Solomon R. Guggenheim Museum, New York
|140.3 x 200.3
|-
|
|1913Landscape|Hermitage Museum, Saint Petersburg
|88 x 100
|-
|
|1913Study for Composition VII (Draft 2)|Lenbachhaus, Munich
|100 x 140
|-
|
|1913Draft 3 for Composition VII|Lenbachhaus, Munich
|90.2 x 125.2Oil and tempera on canvas
|-
|
|1913Composition VII|Tretyakov Gallery, Moscow
|200 x 300
|-
|
|1913Painting with Green Centre|Art Institute of Chicago
|108.9 x 118.4
|-
|
|1913Dreamy Improvisation|Pinakothek der Moderne, Munich
|130.5 x 130.5
|-
|
|1913Improvisation Deluge|Lenbachhaus, Munich
|95.8 x 150.3
|-
|
|1913Light Picture|Solomon R. Guggenheim Museum, New York
|77.8 x 100.2Oil and resin on canvas
|-
|
|1913Landscape with Red Spots|Museum Folkwang, Essen
|78 x 100
|- 
|
|1913Landscape with Red Spots, No 2|Peggy Guggenheim Collection, Venice
|117.5 x 140
|-
|
|1914Improvisation Klamm|Lenbachhaus, Munich
|110 x 110
|-
|
|1914Little Painting with Yellow (Improvisation)|Philadelphia Museum of Art
|78.7 x 100.6
|-
|
|1914Large Study|Museum Boijmans Van Beuningen, Rotterdam
|
|-
|
|1914Large Study on a Mural for Edwin R. Campbell (Summer)|Lenbachhaus, Munich
|99 x 59.5
|-
|
|1914Panel for Edwin R. Campbell No. 1|Museum of Modern Art, New York
|162.5 x 80
|-
|
|1914Panel for Edwin R. Campbell No. 2|Museum of Modern Art, New York
|162.6 x 122.7
|-
|
|1914Panel for Edwin R. Campbell No. 3|Museum of Modern Art, New York
|162.5 x 92.1
|-
|
|1914Panel for Edwin R. Campbell No. 4|Museum of Modern Art, New York
|163 x 122.5
|-
|
|1914Untitled Improvisation|Los Angeles County Museum of Art
|64.8 x 50.2Oil paint on card board
|-
|
|1914Fugue|Beyeler Foundation, Riehen
|129.5 x 129.5
|-
|
|1914Painting with Three Spots|Thyssen-Bornemisza Museum, Madrid
|121 x 111
|-
|
|1914Painting with a Red Stain|Musée National d'Art Moderne, Paris
|130 x 130
|-
|
|1914Painting on Light Ground|Musée National d'Art Moderne, Paris
|100 x 78
|-
|
|1914Untitled Improvisation I|Lenbachhaus, Munich
|65 x 50.2Oil tempera on cardboard
|-
|
|1916Moscow|Tretyakov Gallery, Moscow
|51.5 x 49.5
|-
|
|1916Zubovsky Square|Lenbachhaus, Munich
|41.8 x 45.8Oil on canvas on cardboard
|-
|
|1916Moscow, Zubovskaya Square, Study|Tretyakov Gallery, Moscow
|
|-
|
|1916View of Moscow from the Window of Kandinsky's Apartment at No. 1, Zubovsky Square|Kunstmuseum Den Haag
|39.6 x 36.6Oil paint on card board
|-
|
|1917Improvisation 209|Krasnoyarsk Museum of Fine Arts
|
|-
|
|1917Improvisation No. 217. The Gray Oval|Yekaterinburg Museum of Fine Arts, Russia
|105 x 133.5
|-
|
|1917A Riding Amazon|National Art Museum of Azerbaijan, Baku
|16 x 13Reverse glass painting
|-
|
|1917Blue Crest|Russian Museum, Saint Petersburg
|
|-
|
|1917Akhtyrka, Nearby Dacha at the Pond's Edge|Musée National d'Art Moderne, Paris
|21 x 28.7Oil paint on card board
|-
|
|1917Akhtyrka, Landscape with Red Church|Musée National d'Art Moderne, Paris
|21 x 28.7Oil paint on card board
|-
|
|1917Akhtyrka, Nina and Tatiana in the Veranda|Musée National d'Art Moderne, Paris
|27.5 x 33.6
|-
|
|1917Akhtyrka, Pond in the Park|Musée National d'Art Moderne, Paris
|29.5 x 37.5
|-
|
|1917Akhtyrka, Main Entry to the Dacha|Musée National d'Art Moderne, Paris
|27.5 x 31.5
|-
|
|1917Akhtyrka, Framework for a Pile of Hay and Farm|Musée National d'Art Moderne, Paris
|23.5 x 33.5Oil paint on card board
|-
|
|1918Amazon in Mountains|Russian Museum, Saint Petersburg
|31 x 25Reverse glass painting
|-
|
|1919Two Ovals|Russian Museum, Saint Petersburg
|107 x 89.5
|-
|
|1919In Grey|Musée National d'Art Moderne, Paris
|129 x 176
|-
|
|1920Points|Ohara Museum of Art, Kurashiki
|110.3 x 91.8
|-
|
|1920Red Oval|Solomon R. Guggenheim Museum, New York
|71.5 x 71.5
|-
|
|1920White Line|Museum Ludwig, Cologne
|98 x 80
|-
|
|1921Multicoloured Circle|Yale University Art Gallery, New Haven
|138.2 x 180
|-
|
|1921Red Spot II|Lenbachhaus, Munich
|131 x 181
|-
|
|1921Circles on Black|Solomon R. Guggenheim Museum, New York
|136.5 x 119.7
|-
|
|1922Black Grid|Musée d'Arts de Nantes
|96.2 x 106.4
|-
|
|1922White Cross|Peggy Guggenheim Collection, Venice
|100.5 x 110.6
|-
|
|1922Small Worlds I|Norton Simon Museum, Pasadena
|24.8 x 21.9
|-
|
|1923On White II|Musée National d'Art Moderne, Paris
|105 x 98
|-
|
|1923Composition VIII|Solomon R. Guggenheim Museum, New York
|140 x 201
|-
|
|1923Circles in a Circle|Philadelphia Museum of Art
|98.7 x 95.6
|-
|
|1923Black and Violet|Private collection
|77.8 x 100.4
|-
|
|1923In the Black Square|Solomon R. Guggenheim Museum, New York
|97.5 x 93.3
|-
|
|1924Yellow Accompaniment|Solomon R. Guggenheim Museum, New York
|99.2 x 97.4
|-
|
|1924Blue Painting|Solomon R. Guggenheim Museum, New York
|50.7 x 49.5
|-
|
|1924Quiet Harmony|Museum Kunstpalast, Dusseldorf
|62.5 x 51Oil on paper
|-
|
|1924Contrasting Sounds|Musée National d'Art Moderne, Paris
|70 x 49.5Oil paint on card board
|-
|
|1924Fall Silent|Museum Boijmans Van Beuningen, Rotterdam
|55.3 x 49.3Oil and ink on canvas
|-
|
|1924Quiet Pink|Museum Ludwig, Cologne
|63.6 x 48.2
|-
|
|1924Rose with Gray|Nelson-Atkins Museum of Art, Kansas City
|59.8 x 48.6Oil on pulpboard
|-
|
|1924A Centre|Kunstmuseum Den Haag
|140.7 x 99.8
|-
|
|1925Bright Unity|Solomon R. Guggenheim Museum, New York
|69.9 x 49.9Oil on board
|-
|
|1925Pointed and Round|Solomon R. Guggenheim Museum, New York
|69.8 x 50Oil on board
|-
|
|1925Three Elements|Strasbourg Museum of Modern and Contemporary Art
|68 x 48Oil paint on card board
|-
|
|1925Swinging|Tate Modern, London
|70.5 x 50.2Oil on board
|-
|
|1925Yellow-Red-Blue|Musée National d'Art Moderne, Paris
|128 x 201.5
|-
|
|1925Abstract Interpretation|Yale University Art Gallery, New Haven
|49.5 x 34.6Oil on board
|-
|
|1925In the Bright Oval|Thyssen-Bornemisza Museum, Madrid
|73 x 59Oil on carton
|-
|
|1925Black Triangle|Museum Boijmans Van Beuningen, Rotterdam
|95 x 70.7Oil paint on card board
|-
|
|1925Oval No.2|Musée National d'Art Moderne, Paris
|34.5 x 28.7Oil paint on card board
|-
|
|1925In Blue|Kunstsammlung Nordrhein-Westfalen, Düsseldorf
|80 x 110Oil on paper
|-
|
|1925Sign|Los Angeles County Museum of Art
|68.9 x 49Oil paint on card board
|-
|
|1926Three Sounds|Solomon R. Guggenheim Museum, New York
|60.3 x 59.7
|-
|
|1926Extended|Solomon R. Guggenheim Museum, New York
|95.3 x 44.1Oil on panel
|-
|
|1926To Nina for Christmas|Musée National d'Art Moderne, Paris
|32.8 x 44.6Oil paint on card board
|-
|
|1926Development|Musée National d'Art Moderne, Paris
|32 x 40Oil paint on card board
|-
|
|1926Easter Egg|Musée National d'Art Moderne, Paris
|26.5 x 22Oil paint on card board
|-
|
|1926Accent in Rose|Musée National d'Art Moderne, Paris
|100.5 x 80.5
|-
|
|1926Small Yellow|Yale University Art Gallery, New Haven
|41.5 x 32.3Oil on board
|-
|
|1926Several Circles|Solomon R. Guggenheim Museum, New York
|140.7 x 140.3
|-
|
|1926Yellow Centre|Museum Boijmans Van Beuningen, Rotterdam
|45.5 x 37.6
|-
|
|1927Rays|Museum Boijmans Van Beuningen, Rotterdam
|99.5 x 74
|-
|
|1927Isolated Sounds|Musée National d'Art Moderne, Paris
|33.1 x 40.9<bf>Oil paint on card board
|-
|
|1927Free|Museo Nacional Centro de Arte Reina Sofía, Madrid
|50 x 37Oil paint on card board
|-
|
|1927Heavy Circles|Norton Simon Museum, Pasadena
|57.2 x 52.1
|-
|
|1928On the Points|Musée National d'Art Moderne, Paris
|140 x 140
|-
|
|1928A Circle|Musée National d'Art Moderne, Paris
|35 x 25
|-
|
|1928Gentle Event|Musée National d'Art Moderne, Paris
|38.6 x 67.8Oil paint on card board
|-
|
|1928Coloured Sticks|Solomon R. Guggenheim Museum, New York
|42.9 x 32.7Tempera on paperboard
|-
|
|1929Cold|Musée National d'Art Moderne, Paris
|48.8 x 49Oil paint on card board
|-
|
|1929Eight Times|Musée National d'Art Moderne, Paris
|24.3 x 40Oil on granite preparation on plywood
|-
|
|1929Levels|Solomon R. Guggenheim Museum, New York
|56.5 x 40.6Oil on masonite
|-
|
|1929Untitled|Musée National d'Art Moderne, Paris
|11.4 x 33Oil paint on card board
|-
|
|1929Circle (with Brown)|Museo Nacional de Bellas Artes, Buenos Aires
|51.5 x 38Oil paint on card board
|-
|
|1929One-Two|Museum Boijmans Van Beuningen, Rotterdam
|51.4 x 41.4Oil paint on card board
|-
|
|1929Inner Alliance|Albertina, Vienna
|76 x 66
|-
| 
|1929Upward|Peggy Guggenheim Collection, Venice
|70 x 49
|-
|
|1929Light in Heavy|Museum Boijmans Van Beuningen, Rotterdam
|49.5 x 49.5Oil paint on card board
|-
|
|1930Yellow Border|Los Angeles County Museum of Art
|49 x 49Oil paint on card board
|-
|
|1930Two Squares|Musée National d'Art Moderne, Paris
|33.2 x 23.6Tempera on cardboard
|-
|
|1930
Flächen und Linien (Surfaces and Lines)
|Private Collection
(listed Sotheby's March 2, 2023 Lot 239)
|49 x 70
Oil on Board
|-
|
|1930Leichtes|Musée National d'Art Moderne, Paris
|69 x 48Ripolin on cardboard
|-
|
|193013 Rectangles|Musée National d'Art Moderne, Paris
|69.5 x 59.5Oil paint on card board
|-
|
|1930Green Void|Musée National d'Art Moderne, Paris
|35 x 40Oil paint on card board
|-
|
|1930White Sharpness|Museum Boijmans Van Beuningen, Rotterdam
|86.8 x 65.5Oil paint on card board
|-
|
|1930Moody|Museum Boijmans Van Beuningen, Rotterdam
|40.5 x 56Oil paint on card board
|-
|
|1931Slowed Release|Musée National d'Art Moderne, Paris
|59.8 x 69.5Oil and tempera on cardboard
|-
|
|1931Brownish|San Francisco Museum of Modern Art
|49.2 x 70.2Oil paint on card board
|-
|
|1931Soft Pressure|Museum of Modern Art, New York
|99.5 x 99Oil on plywood
|-
|
|1932Unequal|Norton Simon Museum, Pasadena
|60 x 70.2Oil and gouache on canvas
|-
|
|1932Decisive Rose|Solomon R. Guggenheim Museum, New York
|81 x 100
|-
|
|1932Fixed Flight|Private collection
|49 x 70
|-
|
|1932White - Soft and Hard|Museum of Modern Art, New York
|80 x 99.8Oil and gouache on canvas
|-
|
|1933Development in Brown|Musée National d'Art Moderne, Paris
|101 x 120.5
|-
|
|1933Pink Compensation|Musée National d'Art Moderne, Paris
|92 x 73Oil and tempera on canvas
|-
|
|1934Graceful Ascent|Solomon R. Guggenheim Museum, New York
|80.3 x 80.6
|-
|
|1934Striped|Solomon R. Guggenheim Museum, New York
|81 x 100Oil and sand on canvas
|-
|
|1934Two Surroundings|Stedelijk Museum Amsterdam
|
|-
|
|1934Black Forms on White|Zervos Museum, Vézelay
|70 x 70
|-
|
|1935Succession|The Phillips Collection, Washington D.C.
|80.9 x 100
|-
|
|1935Two Green Points|Musée National d'Art Moderne, Paris
|115 x 162.5Oil and sand on canvas
|-
|
|1935Green Accent|Solomon R. Guggenheim Museum, New York
|81.3 x 100Tempera and oil on canvas
|-
|
|1935Accompanied Contrast|Solomon R. Guggenheim Museum, New York
|97.1 x 162.1Oil and sand on canvas
|-
|
|1935Brown with Supplement|Museum Boijmans Van Beuningen, Rotterdam
|81 x 100
|-
|
|1935Movement I|Tretyakov Gallery, Moscow
|116 x 89
|-
|
|1935Orange Violet|Solomon R. Guggenheim Museum, New York
|89.4 x 116.5
|-
|
|1936Composition IX|Musée National d'Art Moderne, Paris
|113.5 x 195
|-
|
|1936Dominant Curve|Solomon R. Guggenheim Museum, New York
|129.2 x 194.3
|-
|
|1937Sweet Trifles|Strasbourg Museum of Modern and Contemporary Art
|60 x 25Oil and watercolour on canvas
|-
|
|1937Capricious Forms|Solomon R. Guggenheim Museum, New York
|88.9 x 114.8
|-
|
|1937Thirty|Musée National d'Art Moderne, Paris
|81 x 100
|-
|
|1938Yellow Painting|Solomon R. Guggenheim Museum, New York
|116.4 x 88.9Oil and enamel on canvas
|-
|
|1938La Forme Rouge|Private collection
|82 x 60
|-
|
|1938Colourful Ensemble|Musée National d'Art Moderne, Paris
|116 x 89
|-
|
|1938Penetrating Green|Baltimore Museum of Art
|74.1 x 125.4
|-
|
|1939Composition X|Kunstsammlung Nordrhein-Westfalen, Düsseldorf
|130 x 195
|-
|
|1939Complex-Simple|Museum of Grenoble
|100.5 x 82
|-
|
|1940Sky Blue|Musée National d'Art Moderne, Paris
|100 x 73
|-
|
|1940Moderation|Solomon R. Guggenheim Museum, New York
|99.7 x 64.6Oil and enamel on canvas
|-
|
|1940Around the Circle|Solomon R. Guggenheim Museum, New York
|97.2 x 146.4Oil and enamel on canvas
|-
|
|1940Diverse Parties|Lenbachhaus, Munich
|89 x 116
|-
|
|1940Little Accents|Solomon R. Guggenheim Museum, New York
|32 x 42Oil on wood panel
|-
|
|1940The Whole|National Museum of Modern Art, Tokyo
|
|-
|
|1941Various Actions|Solomon R. Guggenheim Museum, New York
|89.2 x 116.2Oil and enamel on canvas
|-
|
|1942Vertical Accents|Solomon R. Guggenheim Museum, New York
|32.1 x 41.9Oil on wood panel
|-
|
|1942Reciprocal Accords|Musée National d'Art Moderne, Paris
|114 x 146
|-
|
|1943Around the Line|Thyssen-Bornemisza Museum, Madrid
|42 x 57.8Oil paint on card board
|-
|
|1943Circle and Square|Musée National d'Art Moderne, Paris
|42 x 58Oil and goache on cardboard
|-
|
|1943Fragments|Solomon R. Guggenheim Museum, New York
|41.9 x 57.9Oil and goache on board
|-
|
|1943Conglomerate|Musée National d'Art Moderne, Paris
|58 x 42Oil and goache on cardboard
|-
|
|1943White Figure|Solomon R. Guggenheim Museum, New York
|58 x 42Oil paint on card board
|-
|
|1944Tempered Elan|Musée National d'Art Moderne, Paris
|42 x 58Oil paint on card board
|-
|
|1944Unfinished Painting|Musée National d'Art Moderne, Paris
|42 x 58Oil paint on card board
|-
|
|1944Ribbon with Squares|Solomon R. Guggenheim Museum, New York
|41.9 x 57.8Oil and goache on board
|-
|
|1944Unfinished Painting|Musée National d'Art Moderne, Paris
|42 x 58Oil and goache on cardboard
|-
|
|1944Untitled|Musée National d'Art Moderne, Paris
|58 x 42Oil and tempera on cardboard
|-
|
|1944The Little Red Circle|Musée National d'Art Moderne, Paris
|42 x 58Oil and goache on cardboard
|-
|}

Museums
Albertina, Vienna
Art Institute of Chicago
Baltimore Museum of Art
Beyeler Foundation, Riehen
Dallas Museum of Art
Hermitage Museum, Saint Petersburg
Kunsthalle Hamburg
Kunstmuseum Den Haag
Kunstsammlung Nordrhein-Westfalen, Düsseldorf
Lenbachhaus, Munich
Los Angeles County Museum of Art
Metropolitan Museum of Art, New York
Minneapolis Institute of Art
Musée d'Arts de Nantes
Musée National d'Art Moderne, Paris
Museo Nacional Centro de Arte Reina Sofía, Madrid
Museo Nacional de Bellas Artes (Buenos Aires)
Museum Boijmans Van Beuningen, Rotterdam
Museum Folkwang, Essen
Museum Kunstpalast, Dusseldorf
Museum Ludwig, Cologne
Museum of Fine Arts, Houston
Museum of Grenoble
Museum of Modern Art, New York City
National Art Museum of Azerbaijan, Baku
National Gallery of Armenia, Yerevan
National Gallery of Art, Washington D.C.
National Museum of Modern Art, Tokyo
Nelson-Atkins Museum of Art, Kansas City
Norton Simon Museum, Pasadena
Ohara Museum of Art, Kurashiki
Peggy Guggenheim Collection, Venice
Philadelphia Museum of Art
Pinakothek der Moderne, Munich
Russian Museum, Saint Petersburg
Saint Louis Art Museum
San Francisco Museum of Modern Art
Solomon R. Guggenheim Museum, New York
Staatsgalerie Stuttgart
Stedelijk Museum Amsterdam
Strasbourg Museum of Modern and Contemporary Art
Tate Modern, London
The Phillips Collection, Washington D.C.
Thyssen-Bornemisza Museum, Madrid
Tretyakov Gallery, Moscow
Van Abbemuseum, Eindhoven
Von der Heydt Museum, Wuppertal
Yale University Art Gallery, New Haven
Yekaterinburg Museum of Fine Arts, Russia

See also
 The Blue Rider (1903)
 Das Bunte Leben (1907)
 Landscape with Red Spots (1913)
 Composition VI (1913)
 Composition VII (1913)
 Improvisation No. 30 (Cannons) (19111913)
 Auf Weiss II (Sur blanc II) (1923)
 Three Elements (1925)
 Upward (1929)
 Composition X (1939)
 Der Blaue Reiter

Notes

References

Further reading
Benjamin, Jean K., Kandinsky, Wassily, Röthel, Hans Konrad. Kandinsky: catalogue raisonné of the oil paintings / Vol.1: 1900–1915. London: Sotheby, 1982 
Benjamin, Jean K., Kandinsky, Wassily, Röthel, Hans Konrad. Kandinsky : catalogue raisonné of the oil-paintings / Vol. 2, 1916–1944''. Amsterdam: Meulenhoff/Landshoff, 1984

External links 

 Artcyclopedia.com, Wassily Kandinsky at ArtCyclopedia
 Wassilykandinsky.net – 500 paintings, 60+ photos, biography, quotes, articles

Kandinsky
Modern paintings
Works by artist